Canaman, officially the Municipality of Canaman is a 3rd class municipality in the province of Camarines Sur, Philippines. According to the 2020 census, it has a population of 36,205 people.
Canaman is known for its upscale shopping, heritage which dates back to Spanish era, and its new first class housings.

Canaman is part of the Metro Naga Urban Area.

Etymology

The area that is now Canaman used to very thickly forested. According to Fr. Frank Lynch, S.J., who said that Canaman is the purest among Bicol dialects: “The name Canaman is locally said to be derived from the root kana, meaning "building materials". The suffix -man is taken as a locative, the name thus indicating “place where there are building materials”.

History
Spanish colonization in Canaman began around the 1580s when some Nueva Caceres-based missionaries apparently on their way back from gospel work in either the visita of Quipayo (now Calabanga) or San Gabriel (now a barangay of Pamplona), got their bearings confused and, thinking they were turning eastward from the Bicol River to its Naga tributary, instead entered the Canaman creek which at the time was still a deep and fast flowing stream. They continued paddling until they ended up at a native settlement in what is now the barangay of Poro.

In June 1583, the place was organized into a parish, administered by Fray Pedro Matias de Andrade, a Franciscan who later became the fifth Bishop of Diocese of Caceres. In the 1590s, its church was constructed, which was rebuilt in 1669. The patron saint at that time was San Roque, whose image, said to have come all the way from Spain was met at its arrival by the people of Canaman in the shores of Pasacao.

Philippine-American War
In 1900, after militant Canamanons heard that the Americans were closing in, they burned the church to the ground in an act of self-immolation to prevent desecration of the church at the hands of the new imperialists. The burning was a deliberate and intentional act: the arsonists even gathered and piled on top of the church's expensive organ dry grass and big tree branches to which they touched the match, to make certain that the fire consumed all combustible parts of the 231-year-old building and its interiors.

In 1902, during the provincial governorship of Captain George Curry, the Municipality of Canaman and its office of the presidente municipal was dissolved and lost its independent existence. Canaman was annexed to Nueva Caceres (now Naga City), though some barrio were attached to Magarao and Canaman's top position of presidente municipal was downgraded to concejal encargado.

Public educational system reached Canaman in 1903 with the arrival of a certain Miss Long, an American schoolteacher. She opened the first school now known as Canaman Central School in Dinaga, at the house of Don Basilio Severo (at the spot where the Facoma building stands at present) which the government rented.

In 1909, Canaman regained its status as an independent municipality, when it was separated from Nueva Caceres by an act of the First Philippine Legislature. This was mainly due to the efforts of Tomas Arejola, the representative of the first district of Ambos Camarines to the first legislature.

World War II
On March 8, 1942, three months after Japanese Imperial Forces landed in Legaspi and Naga City, the Tangcong Vaca Guerilla Unit (TVGU) was organized in Barangay San Nicolas, with Juan Miranda as the Commanding Officer, Leon Aureus as the Executive Officer and Elias Madrid as the Finance Officer. Among the numerous taga-Canaman who joined-up soon afterwards either in the unit's intelligence or combat components were Jose and Antonio Madrid, Mamerto Sibulo, Andres Fortaleza, Marcos Severo, Damaso Avenilla, Federico Crescini, Nicolas Vargas, Venancio Begino, Eugenio Ragodon, Juan Pachica, Santiago Amaro, Jose Gervas, Pedro Angeles, Aproniano Lopez, Andres Alzate, Modesto Sanchez, Blas Alcantara, Andres Aguilar, Florencio Frondozo, Alfredo de la Torre and Flaviano Estrada.

In April 1945, Canaman was liberated by the 5th, 52nd, 53rd, 55th, 56th and 57th Infantry Divisions of the Philippine Commonwealth Army and the Bicolano guerrilla resistance fighters of the Tangcong Vaca Guerrilla Unit (TVGU).

Geography
A landlocked municipality centrally located in the province of Camarines Sur, it is bounded on the north by Magarao, on the south by Gainza and Camaligan, on the east by Naga City, and on the south-west by the broad Bicol River.

Climate

Barangays

Canaman is politically subdivided into 24 barangays.

Demographics

Urbanization is fast in the town due to people from the east going to either the urban areas of Canaman, or Naga City for better opportunities. Which also explains why population has been decreasing in the western barangays.

Economy 

Canaman has the lowest poverty rate in the province of Camarines Sur.

Canaman 3 km east of Naga City is a primarily Residential Municipality. Many suburbs have been built all over the town such as Leticia Heights, Villa Salvacion, RJ village, Peace Village, and Progress homes.

Some provincial offices are located in the town such as Mariners College, CAAP, and DPWH.

For those who can no longer find areas in Naga City, Canaman is a good choice to live in due to its proximity to Naga.
Agricultural

fishing, and small business are the primary sources of employment and household income.

While most of the people's market activities are done in Naga City, Canaman has a public market and a privately owned "talipapa". Two agro-industrial establishments are found in Canaman: the poultry feeds and palay.

Various types of cottage industries like handicraft, furniture, fan making (made of anahaw), ragiwdiw and nipa shingles are conducted in this town.

In 1998, it was recorded that agricultural workers made up only 27.3% of the work force while 70.8% were engaged in non-agricultural activities. 88.38% of the total land area is devoted to agriculture.

In 2014, Canaman Dragon Boat Camp was launched in the village of Mangayawan along the Bicol River which serves as the turf of the Bicol River Hot Paddlers.

An Agricultural Economy
umaAgriculture remains the cornerstone of Canaman’s economy, with 71.7% of the total land area of the municipality, covering 3,101 hectares, used for agricultural purposes. 51% of this is irrigated and generated P126,243,400 of value in 2011, while 48.16% is non-irrigated and generated P96,771,000 of economic output.
Decrease in volume of production is a key issue in this sector. Low production could be accounted to typhoon, flood, saline intrusion, pests and diseases and also due to excessive use of synthetic fertilizers. Ongoing programs to work with farmers regarding synchronized planting, composting instead of burning of rice straws, shifting towards the organic farming approach, diversified and integrated farming and the use of high yielding varieties are needed, such as those being showcased at the Canaman Livelihood Centre at Sta Cruz.

Farming, fishing, employment and small business are the primary sources of most household income of in the municipality. It is estimated that more than 60 percent of the households depend in agriculture and agriculture related activities for their main livelihood. Bicol River Basin Management Project in 1950s envisioned to deliver unprecedented improvement in the economic life not only of Canaman but the entire district.

abaniko-making

Various types of small cottage industries like handicraft, furniture, tiklad making are also conducted in this town to augment household income, and are considered as minor activities. Taga-Canaman have valued the uses of Livistona rotundifolia or anahaw, National Leaf of the Philippines, and it cultural significance. They have also recognized its importance, albeit not indigenous, to their livelihood. Anahaw does not only serve as raw material for roof shingles but it has also become an alternate material for other forms of products such as bags, purse, mats, slippers, costumes and others. Abaniko fan making in Canaman started in 1960s in barangay Sta. Cruz as a leisure pursuit by Macario Adolfo and wife Victoria Bobis.

A Growing Commercial and Services Sector
While traditionally an agricultural economy, the service economy has been steadily growing for some time, with more service businesses located in the municipality.  In addition, a growing number of the municipality’s residents are working in the nearby Naga City.
canaman-marketDespite the variety of goods available locally, people from the municipality tend to shop at the malls in Naga City since it is just 5 kilometers away from the City.  While historically goods were cheaper to purchase in Naga, a growing number of wholesalers are opening in the poblacion area, meaning that goods in Canaman are often no more expensive than those in Naga City. The Canaman Public Market is a thriving commercial precinct home to a range of produce, food, home wares and cooked food outlets.  The Market is well located in the heart of the poblacion area, adjacent to key community facilities such as the municipal health clinic, library, post office and within a short walk from the church, school, public plaza multi-purpose pavement and municipal hall.  Despite this, the market building itself is run-down and requires maintenance in order for the facility to reach its full potential.
While anecdotal evidence suggests there is un-met demand for additional and larger commercial developments in Canaman, it is important that these are located and developed in ways that do not undermine the Canaman Public Market’s role as the anchor land use in the poblacion area

Small sari-sari stores are also prevalent in all barangays while big business establishments are sprouting in barangays adjacent to Naga City and along the national highway. Among the notable Small-Medium Enterprises (SMEs) located in the municipality are Arrow Feeds Corporation in barangay San Vicente, Daluro Shell Station in barangay San Agustin and J Emmanuel Pastries in barangay Haring. The Canaman Public Market serves as the hub of economic activities in the poblacion area.

A boost to Canaman’s image as an emerging entertainment center came with the establishment of radio industry in 1950s. ABS-CBN’s DZRB radio station pioneered broadcasting industry in Camarines Sur. The station became the center of talented local broadcasters who became big men in the broadcast media industry. Within the area, Senator Edmundo B. Cea from Tigaon set up DZGE and later DWEB, the first local AM and FM radio stations in Bicol region. Nordia Complex, an entertainment district composed of a hotel resort and a cockpit arena was constructed the following decade. It became one of the major destinations of local travelers until early 1990s.

Several subdivisions can also be found in Canaman such as Progress Homes, RJ Village, Nueva Caceres Subdivision, Villa Salvacion, Leticia Heights and others. A number of institutions from different sectors of the society including Mariners Polytechnic Colleges Foundation, Aeronautical Academy of the Philippines, Kolping Society, Church of Latter Day Saints, Our Lady of Prompt Succor, and several private preparatory schools have sprouted in the municipality.

Eco-Tourism

Since Canaman is a large flat land and strategically located in the central portion of the Bicol Peninsula. Many people here invested land and turn them into tourism farms. This is not only a benefit for the economy of the town, but also people that live there. The Bicol River is also a benefit.

Housing projects, Real estate, land use

Just a neighboring town of Naga City, Canaman serves as the third urban center after Daet-Naga-Legazpi-Iriga urban corridor. This helps more real-estate to open in the town. The  Barangays Baras, Haring, San Agustin, San Vicente and Del Rosario the areas for real-estate. Warehouses and other industrial buildings are spreading all over the Town.

Culture

Every month of May, the community honors the Holy Cross through Lagaylay, a tradition which began over a century ago. For nine nights, women dance on the church or a chapel's square while chanting prayers to the Cross.

Transportation

Most of the roads and main streets in the poblacion (urban barangays) are concrete with few earth and gravel roads, 4 can be reached only through water transportation while 11 can be reached either through water transportation and/or by land transportation.

References

External links

LGU-Canaman
 [ Philippine Standard Geographic Code]
Philippine Census Information

Municipalities of Camarines Sur
Metro Naga